William George Maxted (January 21, 1917 – October 11, 2001) was an American jazz pianist.

Career
Maxted began his career in 1937 as a member of the Red Nichols big band, for which he wrote arrangements. After three years, he played with Teddy Powell, Ben Pollack, and Will Bradley. He served in the U.S. Navy, then wrote arrangements for the big bands of Claude Thornhill and Benny Goodman. During 1947, he led a band with Ray Eberle and soon after led the Manhattan Jazz Band, which played Dixieland with Bob Zurke on boogie-woogie piano.

During the 1950s, he had a steady job as house pianist at Nick's club in Greenwich Village. He also recorded for MGM, Brunswick, Cadence, and Seeco.  In 1958, British bandleader Reg Owen had a major hit on the American charts with Maxted's upbeat instrumental composition, "Manhattan Spiritual", released on the Palette label.

In the 1960s, he recorded for K&H and Liberty and as a sideman for Bob Crosby, Pee Wee Erwin, and Red Nichols. He moved to Florida in the 1970s, and continued to play around Broward County for many years, including a years long stay at The Beach Club. He died in Fort Lauderdale on October 11, 2001.

Discography
 1955 Billy Maxted Plays Hi Fi Keyboard (Cadence)
 1959 Dixieland Manhattan Style (Cadence) 
 1959 Jazz at Nick's (Cadence)
 1959 Bourbon St. Billy and the Blues (Seeco)
 1959 The Art of Jazz (Seeco)
 1961 Swingability (K&H)
 1963 The Big Swingers (K&H)
 1966 Maxted Makes It! (Liberty)

References

1917 births
2001 deaths
20th-century American pianists
American jazz pianists
American male pianists
Cadence Records artists
Dixieland jazz musicians
20th-century American male musicians
American male jazz musicians